66 Tauri, also known as r Tauri, is a binary star in the constellation of Taurus. The combined apparent magnitude of the system is 5.098, with the magnitudes of the two components being 5.8 and 5.9, respectively. Parallax measurements by Hipparcos put 66 Tauri at some 400 light-years (121 parsecs) away.

This is a visual binary where the positions of the two stars are tracked over time, and used to calculate an orbit. The two stars orbit each other every 55 years. Both stars are A-type main-sequence stars with similar masses.

Notes

References

Taurus (constellation)
Tauri, r
Tauri, 066
A-type main-sequence stars
Binary stars
Durchmusterung objects
027820
1381
020522